South Ayrshire was a county constituency of the House of Commons of the Parliament of the United Kingdom from 1868 until 1983, when it was abolished. It returned one Member of Parliament (MP), elected by the first past the post voting system.

Boundaries

The Representation of the People (Scotland) Act 1868 provided that the new South Ayrshire constituency was to consist of the District of Kyle and Carrick, consisting of the parishes of Auchinleck, Ayr, Ballantrae, Barr, Colmonell, Coylton, Craigie, Dailly, Dalmellington, Dalrymple, Dundonald, Galston, Girvan, Kirkmichael, Kirkoswald, Mauchline, Maybole, Monkton and Prestwick, Muirkirk, New Cumnock, Newton-on-Ayr, Ochiltree, Old Cumnock, Riccarton, St Quivox, Sorn, Stair, Straiton, Symington and Tarbolton, minus the burghs of Ayr, Prestwick and Troon, which formed a part of the Ayr Burghs constituency.

From 1918 the constituency consisted of "The county districts of Ayr and Carrick, inclusive of all burghs situated therein except insofar as included in the Ayr District of Burghs."

Members of Parliament

Election results

Election in the 1860s

Elections in the 1870s

Elections in the 1880s

Elections in the 1890s

Elections in the 1900s

Elections in the 1910s

General Election 1914–15:

Another General Election was required to take place before the end of 1915. The political parties had been making preparations for an election to take place and by July 1914, the following candidates had been selected; 
Liberal: William Robertson
Unionist: 
Labour: James Brown

Elections in the 1920s

Elections in the 1930s

Elections in the 1940s

Elections in the 1950s

Elections in the 1960s

Elections in the 1970s

See also 
 List of former United Kingdom Parliament constituencies

References

Historic parliamentary constituencies in Scotland (Westminster)
Constituencies of the Parliament of the United Kingdom established in 1868
Constituencies of the Parliament of the United Kingdom disestablished in 1983
Politics of South Ayrshire